Amphidromus xiengkhaungensis is a species of air-breathing land snail, a terrestrial pulmonate gastropod mollusc in the family Camaenidae. It has been described according to empty shells only.

Distribution
Distribution of Amphidromus xiengkhaungensis include Phou Kout District within Xiangkhouang Province in Laos.

References

External links 

xiengkhaungensis
Gastropods described in 2017